The Court of Exchequer Chamber was an English appellate court for common law civil actions before the reforms of the Judicature Acts of 1873–1875. It originated in the fourteenth century, established in its final form by a statute of 1585.

The court heard references from the King's Bench, the Court of Exchequer and, from 1830, directly rather than indirectly from the Court of Common Pleas. It was constituted of four judges belonging to the two courts that had been uninvolved at first instance. In cases of exceptional importance such as the Case of Mines (1568) and R v Hampden (1637) twelve common law judges, four from each division below, sitting in Exchequer Chamber, might be asked to determine a point of law, the matter being referred by the court hearing the case rather than the parties.

Though further appeal to the House of Lords was possible, this was rare before the nineteenth century. As a rule, a judgment of the Exchequer Chamber was considered the definitive statement of the law. Certain judgments like Hampden (the case of ship money) caused political controversy.

It was superseded by the Court of Appeal of England and Wales.

References

Bibliography

Former courts and tribunals in England and Wales
Legal history of England
English civil law
14th-century establishments in England
Courts and tribunals established in the 14th century
1875 disestablishments in England
Courts and tribunals disestablished in 1875